Sweet Rush (Polish: Tatarak) is a 2009 Polish drama film directed by Andrzej Wajda. The film won the Alfred Bauer Prize (in tie with Giant) at the 59th Berlin International Film Festival in 2009.

The film is based on a small-town in Poland in the late 1950s, where an aging woman married to a workaholic doctor meets a young man who makes her feel young again. Framed around this story, lead actress Krystyna Janda discusses the death of her husband from cancer.

Cast 
 Krystyna Janda – Marta / Actress
 Paweł Szajda – Boguś K.
 Jan Englert – Doctor
 Jadwiga Jankowska-Cieślak – Friend
 Julia Pietrucha – Halinka
 Roma Gąsiorowska – Housekeeper
 Krzysztof Skonieczny − Stasiek
 Paweł Tomaszewski – Bridge player
 Mateusz Kościukiewicz – Bridge player
 Marcin Łuczak – Bridge player

External links 

Polish drama films
Films directed by Andrzej Wajda
European Film Awards winners (films)